Mount Butters is a  mountain summit in British Columbia, Canada.

Description

Mount Butters is located in the Battle Range of the Selkirk Mountains. Precipitation runoff from the mountain drains north into Battle Brook which is a tributary of the Incomappleux River, and south into Butters Creek which is a tributary of the Duncan River. Mount Butters is more notable for its steep rise above local terrain than for its absolute elevation.

History
The mountain is named after Professor Frederic King Butters (1878–1945) who climbed in this area 1904–1924. He accomplished more than 50 major climbs in the Selkirk Mountains. He was a Fellow of the Royal Geographical Society, a member of the Alpine Club of Canada, the American Alpine Club, and of the American Geographical Society. The mountain's toponym was officially adopted on July 9, 1946, by the Geographical Names Board of Canada.

The first ascent of the summit was made in 1914 by Frederic Butters, Edward W. D. Holway and Andrew James Gilmour.

Climate

Based on the Köppen climate classification, Mount Butters is located in a subarctic climate zone with cold, snowy winters, and mild summers. Winter temperatures can drop below −20 °C with wind chill factors below −30 °C. This climate supports unnamed glaciers on the slopes and cirques surrounding the peak.

See also
Geography of British Columbia

Beaver Mountain

References

External links
 Mount Butters: Weather forecast
 Frederic King Butters in memoriam: Americanalpineclub.org
 Mount Butters Rock Climbing: Mountainproject.com

Three-thousanders of British Columbia
Selkirk Mountains
Kootenay Land District